Otochilus is a genus of flowering plants from the orchid family, Orchidaceae. It contains 5 known species, native to China, the Himalayas and Southeast Asia.

Otochilus albus Lindl. - Tibet, Assam, Bhutan, India, Nepal, Myanmar, Thailand, Vietnam 
Otochilus fuscus Lindl. - Yunnan, Assam, India, Nepal, Bhutan, Indochina 
Otochilus lancilabius Seidenf. - Tibet, Assam, India, Nepal, Bhutan, Laos, Vietnam
Otochilus porrectus Lindl. - Yunnan, Assam, India, Nepal, Bhutan, Indochina 
Otochilus pseudoporrectus Seidenf. ex Aver. - Vietnam

See also 
 List of Orchidaceae genera

References 

 Berg Pana, H. 2005. Handbuch der Orchideen-Namen. Dictionary of Orchid Names. Dizionario dei nomi delle orchidee. Ulmer, Stuttgart

External links 

Arethuseae genera
Coelogyninae
Orchids of Asia